The 1980–81 season was the fifth time Tennis Borussia Berlin played in the 2. Fußball-Bundesliga, the second highest tier of the German football league system. After 42 league games, Tennis Borussia finished 17th and were relegated. The club also lost in the first round of the DFB-Pokal; going out 2–0 away to VfL Osnabrück. Norbert Stolzenburg scored 14 of the club's 47 league goals.

1980–81 Tennis Borussia Berlin squad

1980–81 fixtures

Player statistics

Final league position – 17th

References

External links 
 1980–81 Tennis Borussia Berlin season – squad and statistics at fussballdaten.de 

Tennis Borussia Berlin seasons
German football clubs 1980–81 season